Titanattus is a genus of jumping spiders that was first described by George and Elizabeth Peckham in 1885. The name is a combination of "Titan" and the common salticid suffix -attus. It was merged with Agelista in 2017.

Species
 it contains eleven species, found in Central America, Venezuela, Ecuador, Argentina, Paraguay, and Brazil:
Titanattus andinus  (Simon, 1900) – Brazil, Paraguay, Argentina
Titanattus cordia Edwards & Baert, 2018 – Ecuador (Galapagos Is.)
Titanattus cretatus Chickering, 1946 – Panama
Titanattus euryphaessa Bustamante & Ruiz, 2017 – Brazil, Ecuador
Titanattus notabilis (Mello-Leitão, 1943) – Brazil, Argentina
Titanattus novarai Caporiacco, 1955 – Venezuela
Titanattus paganus Chickering, 1946 – Panama
Titanattus pallidus Mello-Leitão, 1943 – Brazil
Titanattus parvus (Mello-Leitão, 1945) – Argentina
Titanattus pegaseus Simon, 1900 – Brazil
Titanattus saevus Peckham & Peckham, 1885 (type) – Guatemala

References

External links
Photographs of three unidentified Agelista species from Brazil

Salticidae genera
Salticidae
Spiders of Central America
Spiders of South America